The 1923 Marquette Golden Avalanche football team was an American football team that represented Marquette University as an independent during the 1923 college football season. In its second season under head coach Frank Murray, the team compiled an 8–0 record.

Schedule

References

Marquette
Marquette Golden Avalanche football seasons
College football undefeated seasons
Marquette Golden Avalanche football